Fred Perry (2 January 1904 – 11 January 1981) was a British boxer. He competed in the men's featherweight event at the 1928 Summer Olympics.

References

1904 births
1981 deaths
Welsh male boxers
British male boxers
Olympic boxers of Great Britain
Boxers at the 1928 Summer Olympics
Boxers from Cardiff
Featherweight boxers